Jeffrey Scott Grotewold (born December 8, 1965) is a former Major League Baseball player who played for two seasons. He played for the Philadelphia Phillies for 72 games, primarily as a pinch hitter, during the 1992 season. In July of this year, Grotewold hit three pinch hit home runs on three consecutive days, but in the course of four pinch hit appearances as one of these days saw a double header.  He also played in 15 games for the Kansas City Royals during the team's 1995 season.

Grotewold attended the University of San Diego, where he played college baseball for the Toreros from 1984-1986.

References

External links

1965 births
Living people
Kansas City Royals players
Philadelphia Phillies players
Major League Baseball designated hitters
Baseball players from California
San Diego Toreros baseball players
Duluth-Superior Dukes players
Clearwater Phillies players
Omaha Royals players
Portland Beavers players
Reading Phillies players
San Bernardino Spirit players
Scranton/Wilkes-Barre Red Barons players
Spartanburg Phillies players